Kosmos 25 ( meaning Cosmos 25), also known as DS-P1 No.4 was a prototype radar target satellite for anti-ballistic missile tests, which was launched by the Soviet Union in 1964 as part of the Dnepropetrovsk Sputnik programme. Its primary mission was to demonstrate the necessary technologies for radar tracking of spacecraft, which would allow future satellites to function as targets.

It was launched aboard a Kosmos-2I 63S1 rocket, from Mayak-2 at Kapustin Yar. The launch occurred at 13:26 GMT on 27 February 1964.

It decayed from orbit on 21 November 1964.

Kosmos 25 was a prototype DS-P1 satellite, the last of four to be launched. Of these, it was the third to successfully reach orbit after Kosmos 6 and Kosmos 19. It was succeeded by the first operational DS-P1 satellite, Kosmos 36.

See also

 1964 in spaceflight

References

Spacecraft launched in 1964
Kosmos 0025
1964 in the Soviet Union
Dnepropetrovsk Sputnik program